Alex Ferreira (born August 14, 1994) is an American halfpipe skier. He competed in the 2018 Winter Olympic Games, taking home the silver medal. He competed in the 2019 Winter X Games XXIII and  2020 Winter X Games XXIV, placing first in the Men's Ski Superpipe.

Early life
Alex Ferreira was born in Aspen, Colorado. He grew up attending the Aspen school system, where the Aspen High School mascot is The Skiers. Throughout his youth, ages 8–18, Alex was part of the Aspen Valley Ski Club (AVSC). This is where he met his best ski friends: fellow professional skier Torin Yater-Wallace, ski filmer Kyler Sciarrone, and toy designer Mikey Schumacher. At AVSC, Ferreira met some of his biggest ski influences and supporters: His current longtime coach, Elana "E" Chase, and Erik Knight.

Ferreira graduated from Colorado Mountain College in August, 2021 with a Bachelor of Arts in Business Administration. His father, Marcelo, was a professional soccer player from Argentina.  His mother, Colleen, was a New Jersey state-level relay racer who ran ten full marathon races and competed and medaled in the Penn Relays. Colleen is a graduate of West Virginia University and the proprietor of The Red Spa in Aspen, Colorado. His parents met in Vail, Colorado. They were soon married and quickly moved to Aspen, Colorado to raise their family. Alex has one sister, Lourdes.

Competition career
Alex Ferreira put himself on the map when he won a prestigious youth halfpipe competition on February 10–12, 2012. It was named the Gatorade Freelow Finals. This competition was hosted by Snowbasin Ski Resort, Utah.  This win guaranteed Alex an invite to the professional competition known as the Dew Tour in December 2013 at Breckenridge Mountain Resort, Colorado. Throughout Alex's ski career, he has had many podiums at all the major events for the sport of halfpipe skiing; X Games, Dew Tour, Whistler Ski Invitational, FIS World Cups, and the Olympic Games. In 2018, Alex received a silver medal at the Pyeongchang Olympics in Korea. Alex made history at this Korea Olympics by being the first halfpipe athlete in history to compete and complete an "all doubles run". A double is an acrobatic ski trick that consists of two flipping rotations within a single jump. After the 2018 competition season, Ferreira also won the FIS World Cup Overall, thus earning the coveted FIS Crystal Globe for the Best Male Halfpipe Skier of the Year.

Film Projects
Alongside Ferreira's professional halfpipe career, Alex developed a film persona named Hotdog Hans in 2018. Alex developed this ski character with his good friend and filmmaker, Matt Hobbs. With the character of Hotdog Hans, Alex has produced two feature ski edits and many ski clips uploaded to Instagram and TikTok.  Alex quickly gained a following on TikTok that peaked at 1 million followers. After a long visit to Japan, Ferreira also completed a ski film project in 2019. The completed project debuted on ESPN's The World of X Games in November 2019.

Current life
In the fall of 2021, Ferreira was training and competing to qualify for his second Olympic Games. The qualification period ended in January 2022 and consisted of 5 more competitions; World Cup at Copper Mountain, Dew Tour at Copper Mountain, 2 World Cups at the Canadian Olympic Park, and the final competition at Mammoth Mountain, California January 10, 2022. The 2022 Olympic Winter Games were held in Beijing, China, February 4–20, 2022.

Breaking his "Copper Curse", Alex took first place at both the Grand Prix on December 10, 2021, with a 93.50 and the Dew Tour on December 18, 2021, with a 95.75.

On Saturday, January 8, 2022, Alex Ferreira was named to the United States Winter Olympic Team at a ceremony held at Mammoth Mountain Resort in Mammoth Lakes, California. This is second time being named to Represent the United States at the Winter Olympics. Alex earned his spot by winning the Copper Grand Prix and Dew Tour at Copper Mountain in Colorado in December 2021. Recently, his back-to-back 2nd place at the World Cups hosted by Canadian Olympic Park in Calgary, Canada, more than helped clinch his invitation to the upcoming Winter Olympics in Beijing in February 2022.

References

External links
 Alex Ferreira at U.S. Ski & Snowboard
 
 
 
 

1994 births
Living people
American freeskiers
American male freestyle skiers
American Ninja Warrior contestants
Olympic freestyle skiers of the United States
Olympic silver medalists for the United States in freestyle skiing
Olympic bronze medalists for the United States in freestyle skiing
Freestyle skiers at the 2018 Winter Olympics
Freestyle skiers at the 2022 Winter Olympics
Medalists at the 2018 Winter Olympics
Medalists at the 2022 Winter Olympics
X Games athletes
Sportspeople from Aspen, Colorado
American people of Portuguese descent